The 1962 Idaho gubernatorial election was held on November 6; incumbent Republican Robert E. Smylie defeated Democratic nominee Vernon K. Smith with over 54.6% of the vote to win a third term as governor.

Primary elections
Primary elections were held on June 5, 1962.

Democratic primary

Candidates
Vernon K. Smith, Boise attorney
Charles Herndon, Salmon attorney
John G. Walters, Boise, former state land commissioner
Howard D. Hechtner, Lapwai state senator
Conley E. Ward, Marsing schoolteacher
Clarence H. Higer, Emmett state legislator

Results

Republican primary

Candidates
Robert E. Smylie, two-term incumbent governor
Elvin A. Lindquist, Blackfoot mayor
George L. Crookham, Caldwell state legislator

Results

General election

Candidates
Robert E. Smylie, Republican 
Vernon K. Smith, Democratic

Results

References

1962
Idaho
Gubernatorial